Robin C. A. Hunter (c. March 2, 1919 – March 9, 1987) was a Jamaican Canadian psychiatrist who was Chair of the Department of Psychiatry at Queen's University and University of Toronto, as well as Director and Psychiatrist-in-Chief at the Clarke Institute of Psychiatry. There, Hunter founded their clinical program for transsexual people.

Life and career
Hunter was born in Jamaica and came to Canada in 1940. He joined the Royal Canadian Air Force during World War II. He was shot down over occupied Europe and spent four years as a prisoner of war after being processed at Dulag Luft. After the war, he enrolled at McGill University and earned a medical degree in 1950.

He was head of the Department of Psychiatry at Queen's University until 1966. In 1967, he was appointed to the same position at the University of Toronto, where the department of psychiatry had a largely biological orientation prior to that. According to his colleague and successor Frederick Lowy, Hunter stressed that psychiatric illness can have its roots in genetics and experience, based on his experiences as a psychiatrist and psychoanalyst. He was named Psychiatrist-in-Chief of the Clarke Institute in 1967, becoming Director and CEO in 1969. In 1973, he was appointed Associate Dean (Clinical) of the Faculty of Medicine. Frederick Lowy succeeded Hunter as Chair in 1974.

Hunter died at Toronto Western Hospital from complications of exploratory surgery.

Selected publications

Taylor FK, Hunter RCA (1958). Observation of a hysterical epidemic in a hospital ward. Psychiatric Quarterly 1958 Oct;32(4):821-39. 
Hunter RCA, Prince RH (1961). Comments on emotional disturbances in a medical undergraduate population. Can Med Assoc J 1961 Oct 28;85:989-92. 
Schwartzman AE, Lohrenz JG (1962). A Fifteen-Year Follow-Up Study of Medical Graduates. Can Med Assoc J 1962 Oct 20;87:865-8. 
Hunter RCA, Schwartzman AE (1961). A clinical view of study difficulties in a group of counseled medical students. J Med Educ 1961 Oct;36:1295-301. 
Schwartzman AE, Hunter RCA, Prince RH (1961). Intellectual factors and academic performance in medical undergraduates. Journal of Medical Education 1961 Apr;36:353-8. 
Schwartzman AE, Hunter RCA, Lohrenz JG (1962). Factors related to student withdrawals from medical schools. J Med Educ. 1962 Oct;37:1114-20. 
Schwartzman AE, Hunter RCA, Lohrenz JG (1962). Factors related to medical school achievement. J Med Educ 1962 Aug;37:749-59. 
Hunter RCA, Lohrenz JG, (1964). Nosophobia and hypochondriasis in medical students. J Nerv Ment Dis 1964 Aug;139:147-52. 
Hunter RCA (1966). The analysis of episodes of depersonalization in a borderline patient. International Journal of Psycho-Analysis 1966;47(1):32-41.  
Hunter RCA (1967). On the experience of nearly dying. American Journal of Psychiatry Am J Psychiatry. 1967 Jul;124(1):84-8. 
Voineskos G, Hsu K, Hunter RCA (1984). The teaching of consultation-liaison psychiatry in the undergraduate curriculum of Canadian medical schools. General Hospital Psychiatry 1984 Apr;6(2):117-22.

References

External links
University of Toronto Department of Psychiatry history

1910s births
1987 deaths
Emigrants from British Jamaica to Canada
Canadian physicians